Gretna cylinda, commonly known as the lesser crepuscular skipper, is a species of butterfly in the family Hesperiidae. It is found in Sierra Leone, Liberia, Ivory Coast, Ghana, Togo, Nigeria, Cameroon, Gabon, the Republic of the Congo, the Central African Republic, Angola, the Democratic Republic of the Congo, southern Sudan, Uganda and north-western Tanzania. The habitat consists of forests.

Adults are attracted to flowers, including those of Clerodendron splendens.

The larvae feed on Trachyphrynium braunianum, Thalia welwitschii and Marantochloa cuspidata.

References

Butterflies described in 1876
Hesperiinae
Butterflies of Africa
Taxa named by William Chapman Hewitson